Cătălina Cristea and Irina Selyutina were the defending champions, but both players decided to compete in Berlin at the same week.

Tathiana Garbin and Janette Husárová won the title by defeating Iroda Tulyaganova and Anna Zaporozhanova 6–3, 6–1 in the final.

Seeds

Draw

Draw

References
 Official Results Archive (ITF)
 Official Results Archive (WTA)

Warsaw Cup by Heros - Doubles